Isaiah Coulter (born September 18, 1998) is an American football wide receiver for the Buffalo Bills of the National Football League (NFL). He played college football at Rhode Island. He was drafted 171 overall by the Houston Texans in the 2020 NFL Draft. He also had brief stints with the Chicago Bears and Arizona Cardinals.

College career
Coulter played three years of high school football at Wilde Lake High School before transferring to Gwynn Park High School for his senior year. Coulter signed with Rhode Island, an FCS school. He played linebacker before switching to wide receiver.

Coulter eclipsed the 1,000-yard receiving mark in his junior season, garnering 1,039 over the length of the schedule. In doing so, Coulter was the seventh Rams player to have a 1,000-yard receiving season. He was also named second-team all-Colonial Athletic Association.

After his junior season, Coulter participated in the 2020 NFL Combine, running the 40-yard dash in 4.45 seconds.

Professional career

Houston Texans
Coulter was selected in the fifth round with the 171st overall pick in the 2020 NFL Draft by the Houston Texans. He was placed on injured reserve on September 7, 2020. He was designated to return from injured reserve on October 7, and began practicing with the team again. He was activated on October 28. He was waived on August 16, 2021.

Chicago Bears
On August 22, 2021, Coulter signed with the Chicago Bears. He was waived on August 31, 2021 and re-signed to the practice squad the next day. He signed a reserve/future contract with the Bears on January 11, 2022.

On August 30, 2022, Coulter was waived by the Bears and signed to the practice squad the next day. On October 18, 2022, Coulter was promoted to the Bears' active roster. He was waived on November 1.

Buffalo Bills
On November 3, 2022, Coulter was signed to the Buffalo Bills practice squad. He was released from the practice squad on December 9, 2022.

Arizona Cardinals
On January 4, 2023, Coulter signed with the Arizona Cardinals' practice squad. He was released three days later on January 7, 2023.

Buffalo Bills (second stint)
On January 9, 2023, Coulter signed a reserve/future contract with the Buffalo Bills.

References

External links
Rhode Island Rams bio

1998 births
Living people
People from Brandywine, Maryland
Players of American football from Maryland
Sportspeople from the Washington metropolitan area
American football wide receivers
Rhode Island Rams football players
Houston Texans players
Chicago Bears players
Buffalo Bills players
Arizona Cardinals players